Eddie Rudolph (August 31, 1941 – July 19, 2009) was an American speed skater. He competed at the 1960 Winter Olympics and the 1964 Winter Olympics.

References

1941 births
2009 deaths
American male speed skaters
Olympic speed skaters of the United States
Speed skaters at the 1960 Winter Olympics
Speed skaters at the 1964 Winter Olympics
People from Highland Park, Illinois